Alan Sutherland may refer to:
 Alan Sutherland (artist)
 Alan Sutherland (rugby union)